Annie Lazor (born August 17, 1994) is an American competitive swimmer. She competed at the 2020 Summer Olympics, where she won the bronze medal in the 200 m breaststroke.

Early life and education
Lazor was born in Detroit, Michigan, to David and Stacey Lazor. She has two siblings. Lazor attended Wylie E. Groves High School in Beverly Hills, Michigan, where she was a state champion in swimming. She graduated from high school in 2012. In 2016, she graduated from Auburn University.

Swimming career
Lazor competed at the 2010 USA Swimming Championships, where she finished 44th in the 100 m breaststroke.

At the 2011 USA Swimming Championships, she tied for 52nd in the 100 m breaststroke and tied for 36th in the 200 m breaststroke.

At the 2012 United States Olympic Trials, she finished 51st in the 100 m breaststroke and 15th in the 200 m breaststroke.

Lazor started her NCAA career with the Ohio State Buckeyes in 2012–13. She finished 8th in the 200 y breaststroke at the 2013 Big Ten Championships.

At the 2013 USA Swimming Championships, she finished 21st in the 50 m breaststroke, 23rd in the 100 m breaststroke, and 12th in the 200 m breaststroke.

Lazor started competing for the Auburn Tigers during her NCAA sophomore season in 2013–14. She competed in the 100 y breaststroke, 200 y breaststroke, and 200 y individual medley at the SEC Championships.

At the 2014 USA Swimming Championships, she finished 34th in the 50 m breaststroke, 35th in the 100 m breaststroke, and 8th in the 200 m breaststroke.

At the SEC Championships during her junior season in 2014–15, Lazor finished 6th in the 100 y breaststroke (59.82) and 5th in the 200 y breaststroke (2:09.24). She helped Auburn finish 5th in the 4x100 y medley relay (3:34.58). At the 2015 NCAA Championships, she finished 20th in the 100 y breaststroke (1:00.14) and 10th in the 200 y breaststroke with a personal best time of 2:08.41. She helped her team finish 14th in the 4x100 y medley relay (3:33.92).

At the 2015 USA Swimming Championships, she finished 26th in the 100 m breaststroke and 8th in the 200 m breaststroke.

At the 2016 NCAA Championships, she finished 13th in the 100 y breaststroke and 13th in the 200 y breaststroke. She helped her team finish 21st in the 4x100 y medley relay.

Lazor competed at the 2016 United States Olympic Trials, where she finished 10th in the 100 m breaststroke and 7th in the 200 m breaststroke.

At the 2018 USA Swimming Championships, she tied for 12th in the 100 m breaststroke and finished 3rd in the 200 m breaststroke.

At the 2018 FINA World Swimming Championships (25 m), she won the gold medal in the 200 m breaststroke (2:18.32).

Lazor competed at the 2019 Pan American Games, where she won gold medals in the 100 m breaststroke, 200 m breaststroke, and 4x100 m medley relay.

At the 2020 United States Olympic Trials, she finished 3rd in the 100 m breaststroke (1:05.60) and 1st in the 200 m breaststroke (2:21.07).

At the 2020 Summer Olympics, she won the bronze medal in the 200 m breaststroke (2:20.84).

Personal best times

Long course meters (50 m pool)

Legend: † – achieved en route to final mark

Short course meters (25 m pool)

Awards and honors
 Golden Goggle Award nominee and recipient, Perseverance Award: 2021

Personal life

On December 22, 2022, Lazor announced her engagement to fellow Olympian and Brazilian swimmer Vinicius Lanza whom she had known from training extensively with at Indiana University in Bloomington.

References

External links

1994 births
Living people
American female breaststroke swimmers
Olympic swimmers of the United States
Olympic bronze medalists for the United States in swimming
Pan American Games medalists in swimming
Pan American Games gold medalists for the United States
Swimmers at the 2015 Pan American Games
Swimmers at the 2019 Pan American Games
Swimmers at the 2020 Summer Olympics
Medalists at the 2015 Pan American Games
Medalists at the 2019 Pan American Games
Medalists at the 2020 Summer Olympics
Medalists at the FINA World Swimming Championships (25 m)
Auburn Tigers women's swimmers
Swimmers from Detroit
Ohio State Buckeyes women's swimmers
21st-century American women